Walter Scott, 1st Earl of Buccleuch, 2nd Baron Scott of Buccleuch (before 1606 – 20 November 1633) was a Scottish nobleman.

He was born the son of Walter Scott, 1st Lord Scott of Buccleuch and Mary Kerr and succeeded his father as Lord Scott of Buccleuch on 15 December 1611. He was created Earl of Buccleuch, with the subsidiary title Baron Scott of Whitchester and Eskdaill, on 16 May 1619.

In 1624 several members of the Eliot family conspired to murder the earl, but their attempt came to nothing.

He was commander of a detachment of Scotsmen in the service of Holland in 1629 against the Spaniards, when he served at the Siege of 's-Hertogenbosch. He died on 20 November 1633 in London, but was not buried at Hawick until 11 June 1634 as the ship carrying his body was driven by a storm towards the coast of Norway.

He had married Lady Mary Hay, daughter of Francis Hay, 9th Earl of Erroll and Elizabeth Douglas, around 15 October 1616, with a tocher of 20,000 merks. He had a son and heir, Francis, and two daughters.

References

1633 deaths
Earls of Buccleuch
Year of birth uncertain
Walter
Members of the Parliament of Scotland 1612
Members of the Convention of the Estates of Scotland 1621
Members of the Convention of the Estates of Scotland 1630
Scottish landowners
17th-century Scottish peers